The 1903 Major League Baseball season was contested from April 16 through October 13, 1903. The Pittsburgh Pirates and the Boston Americans were the regular season champions of the National League and American League, respectively. The Americans then defeated the Pirates in the first modern World Series, five games to three.

The defunct Baltimore Orioles were replaced by a new franchise in New York City known as the New York Highlanders; it was the last change to the line up of AL and NL franchises until . The Chicago Orphans were renamed as the Chicago Cubs.

Standings

American League

National League

Postseason

Bracket

"Battle of Ohio"
The Cincinnati Reds and Cleveland Naps played an unofficial best of 11-game exhibition series after the regular season, with Cleveland winning the series six games to three.

League Leaders

Note: AB = At bats; R = Runs scored; H = Hits; 2B = Doubles; 3B = Triples; HR = Home runs; RBI = Runs batted in; BB = Walks; SO = Strikeouts; SB = Stolen bases; W = Wins; L = Losses; ERA = Earned run average; CG = Complete games; SH = Shutouts; IP = Innings pitched; K = Strikeouts

Batting

Pitching

Managers

American League

National League

Events

August 1 – Joe McGinnity becomes the first pitcher to win two complete games in one day, with 4–1 and 5–2 victories for the New York Giants over the Boston Beaneaters in a doubleheader.

References

External links
 1903 in baseball history from ThisGreatGame.com
 1903 Major League Baseball season schedule at Baseball Reference

 
Major League Baseball seasons